Hominis (genitive singular of the Latin word homō, meaning "human being") may refer to :

Biology
 Blastocystis hominis, a human parasite
 Sarcoptes scabiei var. hominis, a human mite subspecies
 Staphylococcus hominis, a species of Staphylococcus found in humans

Religion
Redemptor hominis, the first encyclical written by Pope John Paul II